Maureen Angela Jane Dyson (née Gardner, 12 November 1928 – 2 September 1974) was a British athlete who competed mainly in the 80 metres hurdles. She won silver medals at the 1948 Summer Olympics and 1950 European Athletics Championships, both times losing to Fanny Blankers-Koen. She was coached by Geoff Dyson, whom she married one month after the 1948 Olympics.

Maureen Gardner grew up in the Florence Park area of Temple Cowley, Oxford, and went to Donnington Junior School, Florence Park, Oxford. Her former home at 17 Maidcroft Road now has a blue plaque in her honour.

Running

Gardner competed in flat running at the 1946 European Athletics Championships and finished fourth in the 4×100 m relay (with Sylvia Cheeseman, Winifred Jordan and Joyce Judd) and fifth in the 100 m sprint. At the 1948 Summer Olympics she came second in the 80 metre hurdles to Fanny Blankers-Koen, both of them recording the same time of 11.2 seconds. She also helped Great Britain place fourth in the 4×100 m relay. Two years later she again lost the 80 metre hurdles to Blankers-Koen at the 1950 European Athletics Championships. Gardner was four time AAAs National Champion in the 80 metres hurdles (1947, 1948, 1950, 1951).

Ballet schools
She started a ballet and dance school in Oxford.  On moving to London she started a new school in Wanstead, and both of them continued for a number of years until, in 1962, the Dyson family moved to live in Ottawa, Ontario, Canada. She founded another school in that city.

Maureen's involvement with ballet when she returned to England from 1968 onwards, was mainly as an examiner for the Royal Ballet School. Two years before she died of cancer she was made the Chief Examiner of that organisation.

Family
Gardner married Geoff Dyson at St Mary Magdalen's Church, Oxford, and they had two children. Her son was born in 1949, and after his birth she started training again with the 1952 Summer Olympics as her goal; but when she became pregnant again, she decided to retire from her athletics career. She died from cancer on 2 September 1974, aged 45.

References

External links 
 

1928 births
1974 deaths
Sportspeople from Oxford
British female hurdlers
Olympic athletes of Great Britain
Athletes (track and field) at the 1948 Summer Olympics
Olympic silver medallists for Great Britain
European Athletics Championships medalists
Medalists at the 1948 Summer Olympics
Olympic silver medalists in athletics (track and field)